"The Man Who Came Back" is the sixteenth episode aired of the first series of UFO, a 1970 British television science fiction series about an alien invasion of Earth. The screenplay was written by Terence Feely and the director was David Lane. The episode was filmed from 17 June to 29 June 1970, and aired on ATV Midlands on 3 February 1971. Though shown as the sixteenth episode, it was actually the twenty-first to have been filmed.

The series was created by Gerry Anderson and Sylvia Anderson with Reg Hill, and produced by the Andersons and Lew Grade's Century 21 Productions for Grade's ITC Entertainment company.

Story
Captain Craig Collins is presumed killed when his spacecraft, Ship 534, disappears during a successful UFO attack to disable SID (the Space Intruder Detector, the early warning satellite). However, he is located on an island a few weeks later with very little memory of his craft's splashdown. After S.H.A.D.O.'s medical unit approves his return to active duty, Straker assigns Collins to pilot the NASA SID 2 shuttle and repair SID due to Collins' intimate knowledge of its systems.

Meanwhile, Cols. Lake and Grey both notice changes in Collins' behaviour: he displays aggression when he kisses Col. Lake, with whom he had a relationship before his accident; and he wins a chess game against Col. Grey in just a few moves whereas Collins had never been able to defeat Grey before. These observations are not enough to convince Straker that anything is wrong and he suggests that personal tensions may be colouring the perspective of Lake and Grey (while not admitting that his long friendship with Collins may be colouring his own judgement).
 
During a training weightlifting session, Collins seemingly accidentally injures his co-pilot Col. Paul Foster, leaving Straker as the only qualified person available to replace him. Collins, who has been under alien control since before his crash, plans to kill Straker but during a spacewalk Straker is warned by Foster and manages to sever Collins' oxygen supply, killing his friend instead.

Trivia
 Collins' surname was re-used in the Space: 1999 episode "Breakaway" for the astronaut who tries to cause decompression on Moonbase Alpha under the influence of "magnetic radiations".

Cast

Starring
 Ed Bishop — Col. Edward "Ed" Straker, Commander-in-chief of SHADO
 Michael Billington — Col. Paul J. Foster
 Wanda Ventham — Col. Virginia Lake
 Dolores Mantez — Lt. Nina Barry
 Ayshea — Lt. Ayshea Johnson
 Vladek Sheybal — Dr. Douglas Jackson

Featuring
 Derren Nesbitt — Capt. Craig Collins	
 Lois Maxwell — Miss Holland
 Gary Raymond — Col. John Grey

Other cast
 Roland Culver — Sir Esmond
 Robert Grange — Moonbase doctor
 Anouska Hempel — SHADO operative
 Andrea Allan — Moonbase operative
 David Savile — Hospital doctor
 Nancy Nevinson — Housekeeper

Production notes
Locations used for the filming included Neptune House at ATV Elstree Studios, Borehamwood; Ashridge Farm, Chesham; Pinewood Studios, Buckinghamshire; and MGM-British Studios, Borehamwood.

References

External links

1971 British television episodes
UFO (TV series) episodes